Van Meter Ames (July 9, 1898 — November 9, 1985) was an American academic and educator who served as a professor of philosophy at the University of Cincinnati. From 1959 until 1966, he was the head of the university's philosophy department. In 1976, the American Humanist Association designated him as a fellow for "outstanding contributions to humanist thought in ethics and aesthetics".

Ames was a founding member of the American Society for Aesthetics, serving as its president from 1961 to 1962. He had also served as the president of the American Philosophical Association's Western Division from 1959 to 1960. In 1965, Ames contributed to the Congressional bill that established the National Foundation for the Endowment of the Arts and Humanities and was a member of the national committee that founded it.

Early life and education 
Ames was born on July 9, 1898, in De Soto, Iowa. His father, Edward Scribner Ames, was a theologian and pastor who championed the philosophy of the Chicago school. After the family moved to Chicago, Ames would go on to enroll in the University of Chicago, where he completed his PhD in philosophy with his dissertation, The Aesthetics of the Novel.

Awards and honors 
In 1948, Ames was granted a Rockefeller grant. In 1958, he was granted a Fulbright scholarship to study as a research professor in Japan. 

In 1976, the American Humanist Association designated him as a humanist fellow for outstanding contributions to humanist thought in ethics and aesthetics.

Personal life 
Ames was married to Betty Breneman, with whom he had three children: Sanford Scribner Ames, Damaris Ames, and Christine Ames Cornish.

Selected works

References

Sources 

 
 

1898 births
1985 deaths